The Triple J Hottest 100 of All Time was a music poll conducted in August 1998 amongst listeners of Australian youth radio network Triple J. Nirvana's "Smells Like Teen Spirit" collected the highest number of votes to claim the top position. Voters could submit a list of up to ten different songs as well as nominating one of these as their "all-time" favourite song. It was the fourth such poll organised by Triple J, following similar polls in 1989, 1990 and 1991. Initially, all songs were eligible for the annual Triple J Hottest 100. However, from 1993 onward (after having no list in 1992), only songs released in the previous year were permitted. Thus, the Hottest 100 of All Time is conducted via a separate vote, held irregularly to reflect listeners' favourite songs across all eras.

Full list

Note: Australian artists

Artists with multiple entries
Five Tracks
The Cure (66, 74, 85, 89, 98)

Four Tracks
Nirvana (1, 45, 62, 87)
Pearl Jam (3, 10, 22, 56)

Three Tracks
Jeff Buckley (4, 29, 47)
Metallica (7, 9, 91)
Nick Cave and the Bad Seeds (26, 84, 96)
Radiohead (5, 13, 54)
The Smashing Pumpkins (33, 40, 71)
Tool (24, 48, 57)
U2 (11, 23, 93)

Two Tracks
Beastie Boys (38, 44)
Ben Folds Five (32, 52)
Faith No More (19, 35)
Hunters & Collectors (2, 68)
Jebediah (50, 82)
Led Zeppelin (6, 63)
New Order (30, 60)
Nine Inch Nails (14, 72)
Pink Floyd (41, 90)
R.E.M. (51, 73)
Silverchair (59, 83)
The Offspring (55, 80)
The Whitlams (36, 43)

Other Notes
It was marked with a comical moment when Robbie Buck played the wrong Led Zeppelin song.
Grinspoon's track 'Just Ace', which reached #88 and Ben Folds Five's track 'Brick' which came #32 is to date the only song to chart in an All Time countdown before an official yearly countdown.

Notes

External links 
 Triple J's Hottest 100 of All Time, 1998

1998 in Australian music
1998 All Time
Australia Triple J